Romanization of Chinese is the use of the Latin alphabet to transliterate Chinese. Chinese uses a logographic script and its characters do not represent phonemes directly. There have been many systems using Roman characters to represent Chinese throughout history. Linguist Daniel Kane wrote, "It used to be said that sinologists had to be like musicians, who might compose in one key and readily transcribe into other keys." The dominant international standard for Standard Mandarin since about 1982 has been Hanyu Pinyin, invented by a group of Chinese linguists in the 1950s including Zhou Youguang. Other well-known systems include Wade–Giles (Mandarin) and Yale romanization (Mandarin and Cantonese).

There are many uses for Chinese romanization. Most broadly, it is used to provide a useful way for foreigners who are not skilled at recognizing Chinese script to read and recognize Chinese. It can also be helpful for clarifying pronunciation among Chinese speakers who speak mutually unintelligible Chinese varieties. Romanization facilitates entering characters on standard keyboards such as QWERTY. Chinese dictionaries have complex and competing sorting rules for characters and romanization systems simplify the problem by listing characters in their Latin form alphabetically.

Background 

The Indian Sanskrit grammarians who went to China two thousand years ago to work on the translation of Buddhist scriptures into Chinese and the transcription of Buddhist terms into Chinese, discovered the "initial sound", "final sound", and "suprasegmental tone" structure of spoken Chinese syllables. This understanding is reflected in the precise Fanqie system, and it is the core principle of all modern systems. While the Fanqie system was ideal for indicating the conventional pronunciation of single, isolated characters in written Classical Chinese literature, it was unworkable for the pronunciation of essentially polysyllabic, colloquial spoken Chinese dialects, such as Mandarin.

Aside from syllable structure, it is also necessary to indicate tones in Chinese romanization. Tones distinguish the definition of all morphemes in Chinese, and the definition of a word is often ambiguous in the absence of tones. Certain systems such as Wade–Giles indicate tone with a number following the syllable: ma1, ma2, ma3, ma4. Others, like Pinyin, indicate the tone with diacritics: mā, má, mǎ, mà. Still, the system of Gwoyeu Romatzyh (National Romanization) bypasses the issue of introducing non-letter symbols by changing the letters within the syllable, as in mha, ma, maa, mah, each of which contains the same vowel, but a different tone.

Uses

Non-Chinese 
 Teaching spoken and written Chinese to foreigners.
 Making the actual pronunciation conventions of spoken Chinese intelligible to non-Chinese-speaking students, especially those with no experience of a tonal language.
 Making the syntactic structure of Chinese intelligible to those only familiar with Latin grammar.
 Transcribing the citation pronunciation of specific Chinese characters according to the pronunciation conventions of a specific European language, to allow the insertion of that Chinese pronunciation into a Western text.
 Allowing instant communication in "colloquial Chinese" between Chinese and non-Chinese speakers via a phrase-book.

Chinese 
 Identifying the specific pronunciation of a character within a specific context (e.g.  as xíng (to walk; behaviour, conduct) or háng (a store)). 
 Recitation of Chinese text in one Chinese variety by literate speakers of another mutually unintelligible one, e.g. Mandarin and Cantonese.
 Learning Classical or Modern Chinese.
 Use with a standard QWERTY keyboard.
 Replacing Chinese characters to bring functional literacy to illiterate Chinese speakers.
 Book indexing, dictionary entry sorting, and cataloguing in general.

Non-Chinese systems 
The Wade, Wade–Giles, and Postal systems still appear in the European literature, but generally only within a passage cited from an earlier work. Most European language texts use the Chinese Hanyu Pinyin system (usually without tone marks) since 1979 as it was adopted by the People's Republic of China.

Missionary systems 

The first consistent system for transcribing Chinese words in Latin alphabet is thought to have been designed in 1583–1588 by Matteo Ricci and Michele Ruggieri for their Portuguese–Chinese dictionary—the first ever European–Chinese dictionary. Unfortunately, the manuscript was misplaced in the Jesuit Archives in Rome, and not re-discovered until 1934. The dictionary was finally published in 2001. During the winter of 1598, Ricci, with the help of his Jesuit colleague Lazzaro Cattaneo (1560–1640), compiled a Chinese–Portuguese dictionary as well, in which tones of the romanized Chinese syllables were indicated with diacritical marks. This work has also been lost but not rediscovered.

Cattaneo's system, with its accounting for the tones, was not lost, however. It was used e.g. by Michał Boym and his two Chinese assistants in the first publication of the original and romanized text of the Nestorian Stele, which appeared in China Illustrata (1667)—an encyclopedic-scope work compiled by Athanasius Kircher.

In 1626 the Jesuit missionary Nicolas Trigault devised a romanization system in his Xiru Ermu Zi (simplified Chinese: 西儒耳目资; traditional Chinese: 西儒耳目資; pinyin: Xīrú ěrmù zī; literally: Aid to the Eyes and Ears of Western Literati).

In his 1670 Portuguese language Vocabulario da lingoa mandarina, the Dominican missionary Francisco Varo expanded on Trigault's system. His Spanish language Vocabulario de la lengua Mandarina was published in 1682 and his Arte de la lengua mandarina, published in 1703, is the earliest known published Chinese grammar.

Later on, many linguistically comprehensive systems were made by the Protestants, such as that used for Robert Morrison's dictionary and the Legge romanization. In their missionary activities they had contact with many languages in Southeast Asia, and they created systems that could be used consistently across all of the languages with which they were concerned.

Wade–Giles 

The first system to be widely accepted was the (1859) system of the British diplomat Thomas Wade, revised and improved by Herbert Giles into the (1892) Wade–Giles system. Apart from the correction of a number of ambiguities and inconsistencies within the Wade system, the innovation of the Wade–Giles system was that it also indicated tones.

The Wade–Giles system used the spiritus asper, diacritical marks, and superscript digits (e.g. Ch‘üeh4).

French EFEO system 

The system devised in 1902 by Séraphin Couvreur of the École française d'Extrême-Orient was used in most of the French-speaking world to transliterate Chinese until the middle of the 20th century, then gradually replaced by hanyu pinyin.

Postal romanization 

Postal romanization, standardized in 1906, combined traditional spellings, local dialect, and "Nanking syllabary." Nanking syllabary is one of various romanization systems given in a popular Chinese-English dictionary by Herbert Giles. It is based on Nanjing pronunciation. The French administered the post office at this time. The system resembles traditional romanizations used in France. Many of these traditional spellings were created by French missionaries in the 17th and 18th centuries when Nanjing dialect was China's standard. Postal romanization was used only for place names.

Yale system 

The Yale romanization system was created at Yale University during World War II to facilitate communication between American military personnel and their Chinese counterparts. It uses a more regular spelling of Mandarin phonemes than other systems of its day.

This system was used for a long time, because it was used for phrase-books and part of the Yale system of teaching Chinese. The Yale system taught Mandarin using spoken, colloquial Chinese patterns. The Yale system of Mandarin has since been superseded by the Chinese Hanyu Pinyin system.

Chinese systems

Qieyin Xinzi 
The first modern indigenous Chinese romanization system, the Qieyin Xinzi (English: New Phonetic Alphabet) was developed in 1892 by Lu Zhuangzhang (1854–1928). It was used to write the sounds of the Xiamen dialect of Southern Min. Some people also invented other phoneme systems.

Gwoyeu Romatzyh 

In 1923, the Kuomintang Ministry of Education instituted a National Language Unification Commission which, in turn, formed an eleven-member romanization unit. The political circumstances of the time prevented any positive outcome from the formation of this unit.

A new voluntary working subcommittee was independently formed by a group of five scholars who strongly advocated romanization. The committee, which met twenty-two times over a twelve-month period (1925–1926), consisted of Zhao Yuanren, Lin Yutang, Qian Xuantong, Li Jinxi, and one Wang Yi. They developed the Gwoyeu Romatzyh system, proclaimed on 26 September 1928. The most distinctive aspect of this new system was that, rather than relying upon marks or numbers, it indicated the tonal variations of the "root syllable" by a systematic variation within the spelling of the syllable itself. The entire system could be written with a standard QWERTY keyboard.

Despite the fact that it was created to eventually replace Chinese characters, and that it was constructed by linguists, Gwoyeu Romatzyh was never extensively used for any purpose other than delivering the pronunciation of specific Chinese characters in dictionaries. The complexity of its tonal system was such that it was never popular.

Latinxua Sinwenz 

The work towards constructing the Latinxua Sinwenz system began in Moscow as early as 1928, when the Soviet Scientific Research Institute on China sought to create a means through which the large Chinese population living in the Far East of the Soviet Union could be made literate, facilitating their further education.

From the very outset, it was intended that the Latinxua Sinwenz system, once established, would supersede the Chinese characters. It was decided to use the Latin alphabet because it was thought to serve their purpose better than the Cyrillic alphabet. Unlike Gwoyeu Romatzyh, with its complex method of indicating tones, Latinxua Sinwenz system does not indicate tones at all, and since it is not Mandarin-specific, it can be used for other Chinese varieties.

The eminent Moscow-based Chinese scholar Qu Qiubai (1899–1935) and the Russian linguist V.S. Kolokolov (1896–1979) devised a prototype romanization system in 1929.

In 1931 a coordinated effort between the Soviet sinologists Alekseev B.M., Dragunov A.A. and Shprintsin A.G., and the Moscow-based Chinese scholars Qu Qiubai, Wu Yuzhang, Lin Boqu, Xiao San, Wang Xiangbao, and Xu Teli established the Latinxua Sinwenz system. The system was supported by a number of Chinese intellectuals such as Guo Moruo and Lu Xun, and trials were conducted amongst 100,000 Chinese immigrant workers for about four years and later, in 1940–1942, in the communist-controlled Shaanxi-Gansu-Ningxia Border Region of China. In November 1949, the railways in China's north-east adopted the Latinxua Sinwenz system for all their telecommunications.

For a time, the system was very important in spreading literacy in Northern China, and more than 300 publications, totaling half-a-million issues, appeared in Latinxua Sinwenz. However, the use of the system was later cancelled because of its proposed target of superseding logographic Chinese characters altogether, which was deemed too radical:

In 1944 the latinization movement was officially curtailed in the communist-controlled areas [of China] on the pretext that there were insufficient trained cadres capable of teaching the system. It is more likely that, as the communists prepared to take power in a much wider territory, they had second thoughts about the rhetoric that surrounded the latinization movement; in order to obtain the maximum popular support, they withdrew support from a movement that deeply offended many supporters of the traditional writing system.

Hanyu Pinyin 

In October 1949, the Association for Reforming the Chinese Written Language was established. Wu Yuzhang (one of the creators of Latinxua Sinwenz) was appointed Chairman. All of the members of its initial governing body belonged to either the Latinxua Sinwenz movement (Ni Haishu, Lin Handa, etc.) or the Gwoyeu Romatzyh movement (Li Jinxi, Luo Changpei, etc.). For the most part, they were also highly trained linguists. Their first directive (1949–1952) was to take "the phonetic project adopting the Latin alphabet" as "the main object of [their] research"; linguist Zhou Youguang was put in charge of this branch of the committee.

In a speech delivered on 10 January 1958, Zhou Enlai observed that the Committee had spent three years attempting to create a non-Latin Chinese phonetic alphabet (they had also attempted to adapt Zhuyin Fuhao) but "no satisfactory result could be obtained" and "the Latin alphabet was then adopted". He also emphatically stated:

The development of the Pinyin system was a complex process involving decisions on many difficult issues, such as:
 Should Hanyu Pinyin's pronunciation be based on that of Beijing?
 Was Hanyu Pinyin going to supersede Chinese written characters altogether, or would it simply provide a guide to pronunciation?
 Should the traditional Chinese writing system be simplified?
 Should Hanyu Pinyin use the Latin alphabet?
 Should Hanyu Pinyin indicate tones in all cases (as with Gwoyeu Romatzyh)?
 Should Hanyu Pinyin be Mandarin-specific, or adaptable to other dialects and other Chinese varieties?
 Was Hanyu Pinyin to be created solely to facilitate the spread of Putonghua throughout China?

Despite the fact that the "Draft Scheme for a Chinese Phonetic Alphabet" published in "People's China" on 16 March 1956 contained certain unusual and peculiar characters, the Committee for Research into Language Reform soon reverted to the Latin Alphabet, citing the following reasons:
 The Latin alphabet is extensively used by scientists regardless of their native tongue, and technical terms are frequently written in Latin.
 The Latin alphabet is simple to write and easy to read. It has been used for centuries all over the world. It is easily adaptable to the task of recording Chinese pronunciation.
 While the use of the Cyrillic alphabet would strengthen ties with the U.S.S.R., the Latin alphabet is familiar to most Russian students, and its use would strengthen the ties between China and many of its Southeast Asian neighbours who are already familiar with the Latin alphabet.
 As a response to Mao Zedong's remark that "cultural patriotism" should be a "weighty factor" in the choice of an alphabet: despite the fact that the Latin alphabet is "foreign" it will serve as a strong tool for economic and industrial expansion; and, moreover, the fact that two of the most patriotic Chinese, Qu Qiubai and Lu Xun, were such strong advocates of the Latin alphabet indicates that the choice does not indicate any lack of patriotism.
 On the basis that the British, French, Germans, Spanish, Polish and Czechoslovakians have all modified the Latin alphabet for their own usage, and because the Latin alphabet is derived from the Greek alphabet, which, in turn came from Phoenician and Egyptian, there is as much shame attached to using the Latin alphabet as there is in using Arabic numerals and the conventional mathematical symbols, regardless of their point of origin.

The movement for language reform came to a standstill during the Cultural Revolution and nothing was published on language reform or linguistics from 1966 to 1972. The Pinyin subtitles that had first appeared on the masthead of the People's Daily newspaper and the Red Flag journal in 1958 did not appear at all between July 1966 and January 1977.

In its final form Hanyu Pinyin:
 was used to indicate pronunciation only
 was exclusively based on the pronunciation of the Beijing dialect
 included tone marks
 embodied the traditional "initial sound", "final sound", and "suprasegmental tone" model
 was written in the Latin alphabet

Hanyu Pinyin has developed from Mao's 1951 directive, through the promulgation on 1 November 1957 of a draft version by the State Council, to its final form being approved by the State Council in September 1978, to being accepted in 1982 by the International Organization for Standardization as the standard for transcribing Chinese.

John DeFrancis has described Mao Zedong's belief that pinyin would eventually replace Chinese characters, but this has not come to pass, and in fact such a plan had already ceased together with the end of Latinxua Sinwenz movement.

Tongyong Pinyin
Tongyong Pinyin is a system with some usage in Taiwan. It was introduced by the linguist Yu Bor-chuan in 1998 and was the official romanization of Mandarin in Taiwan between 2002 and 2008. The system was developed in part to create a Taiwanese identity distinct from China, which uses the Hanyu Pinyin. Whether to use this system is considered a political issue in Taiwan.

Variations in pronunciation 
"The Chinese and Japanese repository" stated that romanization would standardize the different pronunciations Chinese often had for one word, which was common for all mostly unwritten languages. Contributor Rev James Summers wrote, in 1863:

See also 
 Comparison of Chinese romanization systems
 Transliteration of Chinese
 Transcription into Chinese characters
 Romanization of Japanese
Vietnamese language
History of writing in Vietnam

Notes

References

Citations

Sources 

 Anon, Reform of the Chinese Written Language, Foreign Languages Press, (Peking), 1958.
 Chao, Y.R., A Grammar of Spoken Chinese, University of California Press, (Berkeley), 1968.
 Chappell, H., "The Romanization Debate", Australian Journal of Chinese Affairs, No.4, (July 1980), pp. 105–118.
 Chen, P., "Phonetization of Chinese", pp. 164–190 in Chen, P., Modern Chinese: History and Sociolinguistics, Cambridge University Press, (Cambridge), 1999.
 DeFrancis, J., Nationalism and Language Reform in China, Princeton University Press, (Princeton), 1950.
 Hsia, T., China's Language Reforms, Far Eastern Publications, Yale University, (New Haven), 1956.
 Ladefoged, Peter; & Maddieson, Ian. (1996). The sounds of the world's languages. Oxford: Blackwell Publishers.  (hbk);  (pbk).
 Ladefoged, Peter; & Wu, Zhongji. (1984). Places of articulation: An investigation of Pekingese fricatives and affricates. Journal of Phonetics, 12, 267-278.
 Lehmann, W.P. (ed.), Language & Linguistics in the People's Republic of China, University of Texas Press, (Austin), 1975.
 Lin, Y., Lin Yutang's Chinese-English Dictionary of Modern Usage, The Chinese University of Hong Kong, 1972.
 Milsky, C., "New Developments in Language Reform", The China Quarterly, No.53, (January–March 1973), pp. 98–133.
 Norman, J., Chinese, Cambridge University Press, (Cambridge), 1988.
 Ramsey, R.S.(1987). The Languages of China. Princeton, NJ: Princeton University Press. 
 San Duanmu (2000) The Phonology of Standard Chinese 
 Seybolt, P.J. & Chiang, G.K. (eds.), Language Reform in China: Documents and Commentary, M.E. Sharpe, (White Plains), 1979.
 Simon, W., A Beginners' Chinese-English Dictionary Of The National Language (Gwoyeu): Fourth Revised Edition, Lund Humphries, (London), 1975.
 Stalin, J.V., "Concerning Marxism in Linguistics", Pravda, Moscow, (20 June 1950), simultaneously published in Chinese in Renmin Ribao, English translation: Stalin, J.V., Marxism and Problems of Linguistics, Foreign Languages Press, (Peking), 1972.
 Wu, Y., "Report on the Current Tasks of Reforming the Written Language and the Draft Scheme for a Chinese Phonetic Alphabet", pp. 30–54 in Anon, Reform of the Chinese Written Language, Foreign Languages Press, (Peking), 1958.

External links 
 
 (the University of California)
 
 (the University of California)
 
 Mandarin Chinese Pinyin Table the complete listing of all Pinyin syllables and their variations used in standard Mandarin, along with native speaker pronunciation for each syllable
 Overview of Chinese phonetic transcription
 Java-based tool for converting texts into different romanization systems
 Chinese romanization
 www.pinyin.info
 www.romanization.com
 Chinese Phonetic Conversion Tool - Converts between Pinyin, Zhuyin, and other formats